The Thin Elk Formation is a geologic formation in South Dakota. It preserves fossils dating back to the Neogene period.

Fossil content

Mammals

Ungulates

See also

 List of fossiliferous stratigraphic units in South Dakota
 Paleontology in South Dakota

References

 

Neogene geology of South Dakota